Michael Lardie (born September 8, 1958) is an American musician and record producer known for his memberships in the rock bands Great White and Night Ranger.

Early life 
Lardie was born on September 8, 1958, in Anchorage, Alaska and raised in Sacramento, California. He is a self-taught musician, having taken only a handful of lessons as a child. He plays guitar, bass, sitar, mandolin, piano, harmonica and flute. At age 17, he started playing in piano bars at night while still attending high school.

Career

Producing and engineering – Early years 
Michael spent most of the early to late eighties learning the craft of analog recording. Although he is well known for producing and engineering Great White records, most would be surprised to know he had a solid career recording other artists long before joining Great White. He was worked on records by artists as diverse as Black Flag, Kajagoogoo, Dokken, Saint Vitus to name a few in his early career.

Great White 
Lardie joined Great White in 1986 as a session and touring rhythm guitarist/keyboardist/backing vocalist and would eventually become a permanent band member, as well as the band's producer and engineer. The group broke up officially in 2000, and their final concert was recorded and released under the name Thank You...Goodnight!. In 2006, Great White reformed and continue to tour .

Production and engineering – Recent times 
When Great White disbanded, Michael returned to his first love. Production. In recent years he has worked on records by Jake E. Lee, Leslie West, Colin Blades (son of Jack Blades, Night Ranger), Shaw Blades and Jizzy Pearl.

Night Ranger 
Michael joined Night Ranger in 2003 as keyboardist/backing vocalist, replacing original keyboardist Alan Fitzgerald. He remained with them until 2007, performing in both Great White and Night Ranger concurrently. When Lardie left Night Ranger to pursue Great White full-time again, Night Ranger hired Christian Matthew Cullen as a replacement.

References 

Living people
1958 births
Glam metal musicians
American heavy metal guitarists
American heavy metal keyboardists
Record producers from Alaska
American audio engineers
Great White members
Musicians from Anchorage, Alaska
20th-century American guitarists
21st-century American keyboardists
20th-century American keyboardists